The Aropaoanui (Awapawanui) river flows from the Lake Tūtira to the Pacific Ocean in the Northern Hawkes Bay. It has been described as one of the cleanest rivers in New Zealand by the Department of Conservation, and is fished for many species including trout and whitebait. The valley and bay into which the river flows are also known as Aropaoanui, as is the metal road which meets the Napier–Wairoa highway.

Aropaoanui is a Māori word which roughly translates to 'big smoke'. In local myth, the area was named when the local tribe were roasting their captives on a fire after a victory in battle. The fatty pulp around the kidneys of their victims began to bubble, giving the impression that the victims were still alive, which terrified the tribespeople.

Rivers of the Hawke's Bay Region
Rivers of New Zealand